Yellow Claw may refer to:

Yellow Claw (comics), Marvel Comics supervillain (1956)
Yellow Claw (DJs), Dutch DJ and record production duo from Amsterdam
The Yellow Claw, a 1915 Sax Rohmer novel
The Yellow Claw (film), 1921 film of the Sax Rohmer novel
Conall Yellowclaw, a Scottish fairy tale